George Le Guere (born George Le Guere Mullally; July 17, 1881 – November 21, 1947) was an American stage and screen actor, he was sometimes credited as George LeGuere.

Biography
Le Guere was a graduate of Georgetown University and later worked for the Thanhouser Company. He appeared on Broadway (employed at one time by David Belasco Theatre) while balancing a silent film career. In his youth he stood out having wavy blond hair.

Selected filmography
The Bachelor's Romance (1915)
The Commuters (1915)
The Blindness of Virtue (1915)
Destiny: Or, The Soul of a Woman (1915)
The Turmoil (1916)
The Evil Thereof (1916)
The Passing of the Third Floor Back (1918) (*uncredited; filmed in 1916)
Cecilia of the Pink Roses (1918)
The Woman the Germans Shot (1918)
The Birth of a Race (1918)
The Way of a Woman (1919)
Missing Millions (1920) 
Mama's Affair (1921)
Men Without Women (1930)

References

External links

1881 births
1947 deaths
Male actors from Memphis, Tennessee
American male stage actors
American male silent film actors
20th-century American male actors